The 2013 Detroit mayoral election was held on November 5, 2013, to elect the Mayor of Detroit, Michigan. Incumbent Mayor Dave Bing chose to retire rather than seek re-election.

The Mayor of Detroit is elected on a non-partisan basis, where the candidates are not listed by political party. A non-partisan primary election was held on August 6, 2013. The top two finishers, businessman Mike Duggan, who ran a write-in campaign and received 46% of the vote, and Wayne County Sheriff Benny N. Napoleon, who won 30% of the vote, advanced to the November general election. In the general election, Duggan was elected mayor with 55% of the vote.

Duggan became the city's first White mayor since 1973, when Coleman Young was first elected.

Background 
The Mayor of Detroit was Dave Bing, who was first elected in May 2009 in a special election following the resignation of Kwame Kilpatrick, then re-elected to full term in November 2009. Bing announced on May 14, 2013, that he would not seek a second full term as Mayor, but would instead form an exploratory committee to run for position of Wayne County Executive in the 2014 mid-term elections.

The filing deadline for the race was May 14, 2013, at 4 p.m. Candidates were required to submit petitions with signatures from 500 registered voters in the city of Detroit to qualify for the August primary ballot. On May 23, 2013, the Detroit Election Commission officially certified the names of 15 candidates that had qualified for the Primary Ballot.

Primary election

Candidates 
There were officially 15 candidates on the ballot. The top two candidates faced off in the November general election.

On the Ballot 
 Tom Barrow, businessman, Mayoral candidate in 1985 and 1989 and runner-up in 2009
 Angelo Brown
 D'Artagnan M. Collier, city worker and member of the Socialist Equality Party
 Krystal A. Crittendon, former Corporation Counsel
 Fred Durhal, Jr., State Representative
 Herman Griffin
 Lisa Howze, former State Representative
 Willie Lipscomb
 Mark Murphy, Community Advocate
 Benny N. Napoleon, Wayne County Sheriff and former Detroit Chief of Police
 John Olumba, State Representative
 Sigmunt Szczepkowski
 John Telford, Educator and Civil Rights activist
 Jean Vortkamp, Community volunteer

Write-ins 
 Mike Dugeon, barber
 Mike Duggan, former CEO of the Detroit Medical Center and Assistant Wayne County Prosecutor

Declined 
 Dave Bing, Mayor of Detroit
 Geoffrey Feiger, attorney and Democratic nominee for Governor of Michigan in 1998
 Charlie LeDuff, Detroit News journalist, writer and WJBK-TV media personality
 Charles Pugh, former WJBK-TV anchor and former  Detroit City Council President
 Sixto Rodriguez, American folk musician and former Detroit Mayoral Candidate
 Andrae Townsel

Controversy 
In May, 2013 Barrow filed formal complains with the Detroit City Clerk's Office against several of his competitors. Barrow first filed a complaint against Duggan, Napoleon, and Olumba, alleging that all three had failed to file campaign finance reports regarding previous campaigns that the three men had used to seek previous political office. On May 21, 2013, Barrow filed a formal complaint challenging the residency qualifications of Duggan. Barrow's complaint alleges that Duggan wasn’t a city resident for a year when, on April 2, he was the first candidate to turn in signatures to make the August ballot. Duggan legally became a Detroit resident on April 16, 2012, after moving to the city’s Palmer Woods neighborhood. The Detroit City Charter, which was adopted on January 1, 2012, states ""All candidates for elective office and elected officials shall be bona fide residents of the City of Detroit and must maintain their principal residence in the City of Detroit for one (1) year at the time of filing for office or appointment to office. " Labor activist and Barrow supporter Robert Davis sent a formal letter requesting Michigan Secretary of State Ruth Johnson intervene in the matter. After Benson refused to intervene, the Detroit Election Commission voted 2-1 on May 23, 2013, to keep Duggan on the ballot. On May 31, 2013, Barrow filed a complaint against the Detroit Election Commission in Wayne County Circuit Court asking the Court to order the Election Commission to remove Duggan from the Mayoral Ballot. On June 12, 2013 Wayne County Circuit Judge Lita Popke ordered that Duggan's name be removed from the ballot. On June 18, 2013 The Michigan Court of Appeals upheld the ruling in a 2-1 decision and on June 19 Mike Duggan officially bowed out of the race. Political analysts predicted that Benny Napoleon would take over as the front runner for the election, and Barrow would still likely be eliminated in the August elections.

On June 28, 2013, Mike Duggan officially declared he was re-entering the mayoral race as a write-in candidate.  As a write-in, Duggan won a plurality of the votes.  He was on the ballot for the November election against second place Benny Napoleon.

Polling

Results

General election

Candidates 
 Mike Duggan, former CEO of the Detroit Medical Center and Assistant Wayne County Prosecutor
 Benny N. Napoleon, Wayne County Sheriff and former Detroit Chief of Police

Polling

Results

References

External links 
Tom Barrow
D'Artagnan Collier
Krystal A. Crittendon
Michael E. Duggan
Fred Durhal Jr.
Herman Griffin
Lisa Howze
M3 | Mark Murphy for Mayor
Benny Napoleon
Jean Vortkamp

2013
Detroit
Detroit
Detroit
mayoral election